Clonia is an African genus of bush crickets in the subfamily Saginae.

Species
The Orthoptera species file lists:
subgenus Clonia Stål, 1855
 Clonia angolana Kaltenbach, 1971
 Clonia burri Uvarov, 1942
 Clonia caudata Uvarov, 1942
 Clonia dewittei Kaltenbach, 1971
 Clonia jagoi Kaltenbach, 1971
 Clonia kalahariensis Kaltenbach, 1971
 Clonia kenyana Uvarov, 1942
 Clonia multispina Uvarov, 1942
 Clonia saussurei Kaltenbach, 1971
 Clonia uvarovi Kaltenbach, 1971
 Clonia wahlbergi Stål, 1855 - type species
 Clonia zernyi Kaltenbach, 1971
subgenus Hemiclonia Kirby, 1906
 Clonia assimilis Kaltenbach, 1971
 Clonia charpentieri Kaltenbach, 1971
 Clonia ignota Kaltenbach, 1981
 Clonia lalandei Saussure, 1888
 Clonia melanoptera (Linnaeus, 1758)
subgenus Leptoclonia Kaltenbach, 1971
 Clonia minuta (Haan, 1843)
 Clonia vansoni Kaltenbach, 1971
 Clonia vittata (Thunberg, 1789)
subgenus Xanthoclonia Kaltenbach, 1971
 Clonia tessellata Saussure, 1888

References

External links 
 
 
 Clonia at insectoid.info

Tettigoniidae genera
Orthoptera of Africa